Upptåg is the third studio album from Swedish singer/songwriter Ted Gärdestad, released in 1974 on the Polar Music label. It contains the hits "Fantomen", "Silver", "Eiffeltornet" and "Viking". The album was produced by Benny Andersson, Björn Ulvaeus and Ted, engineered by Michael B. Tretow and features vocals by Agnetha Fältskog and Anni-Frid Lyngstad.

A non-album single followed in early 1975, the Melodifestivalen entry "Rockin 'n' Reelin'" (#7), backed with an English-language version of the track "Jag Ska Fånga En Ängel" from 1973 album Ted, entitled "Gonna Make You My Angel". Both the English-language version of "Rockin 'n' Reelin'" and "Gonna Make You My Angel" remain unreleased on CD.

Track listing
Music by Ted Gärdestad, lyrics by Kenneth Gärdestad

Side A:
"Silver" – 3:33  
"Öppna din himmel" – 2:43  
"Viking" – 3:37  
"Buffalo Bill" – 3:53  
"Love Comes" – 3:18

Side B:
"Eiffeltornet" – 3:04  
"Goliat från gat" – 3:54  
"Can't Stop The Train" – 3:18  
"Fantomen" – 3:02  
"Regnbågen" – 2:04

Personnel
 Ted Gärdestad – lead vocals, acoustic guitar
 Benny Andersson – honky-tonk piano, Moog synthesizer, Mellotron 
 Björn J:son Lindh – piano, flute
 Janne Schaffer – electric guitar
 Lasse Wellander – acoustic guitar
 Mike Watson – bass guitar
 Johnny Gustafsson – bass
 Ola Brunkert – drums
 Bengt Belfrage – horn "Regnbågen"
 Kenneth Arnström – soprano saxophone "Eiffeltornet", alto saxophone "Silver"
 Christer Eklund – tenor saxophone "Buffalo Bill"
 Jan Kling – tenor saxophone "Buffalo Bill"
 Malando Gassama – congas
 Agnetha Fältskog – backing vocals
 Anni-Frid Lyngstad – backing vocals
 Lena Karlsson-Ericsson – backing vocals
 Liza Öhman – backing vocals
 Kai Kjäll – backing vocals

Production
 Benny Andersson – producer
 Björn Ulvaeus – producer
 Ted Gärdestad – producer
 Michael B. Tretow – sound engineer
 Rune Persson – sound engineer
 Åke Elmsäter – sound engineer
 Björn J:son Lindh – strings and brass arrangements
 Recorded at Metronome Studios, Stockholm
 Originally released as Polar POLS 253, 1974.

Sources and external links
 Official home page, The Ted Gärdestad Society
 Liner notes Upptåg, Ted Gärdestad, Polar Music POLS 253, 1974.
 [ Allmusic.com entry, Upptåg, Ted Gärdestad, 1974]

1974 albums
Ted Gärdestad albums
Swedish-language albums